Greatest Hits is a compilation album released by Night Ranger in 1989. It included tracks from each of the band's first five studio albums. In 1994, the album was certified Gold by the RIAA for shipments of half a million copies to U.S. retailers.

Track listing

Personnel
Night Ranger

 Jack Blades – bass guitar, vocals
 Alan Fitzgerald – keyboards, vocals (except on Restless Kind)
 Brad Gillis – guitar, vocals
 Kelly Keagy – drums, vocals
 Jeff Watson – guitar

Additional musicians

 Jesse Bradman – keyboards (on Restless Kind)
 Joyce Imbesi – keyboards (on Restless Kind)

Production

 Brian Foraker – producer (track 9)
David Foster – producer (track 8)
Greg Fulginiti – mastering
 Pat Glasser – producer (1–7, 10–12)
 Andy McKaie – compiler, coordinator

Certifications

References 

1989 greatest hits albums
Night Ranger albums